Antonio Ruffo (1610 or 1611 - 16 June 1678) was an important Sicilian politician, nobleman, patron and collector from the Ruffo di Calabria family. He was probably born in Castle Bagnara or Messina and died in Messina.

His collections included coins, silverware, paintings by Anthony van Dyck (Saint Rosalie Interceding for the Plague–Stricken of Palermo), Paul Bril, Jacob Jordaens, Abraham Casembroot and others, several Rembrandt etchings and tapestries of The Life of Achilles to designs by Rubens. He commissioned three paintings from Rembrandt (Aristotle with a Bust of Homer, Alexander the Great and Homer Dictating his Verses) and corresponded with Artemisia Gentileschi, Cornelis de Wael and Abraham Brueghel.

References

Politicians from Messina
1610s births
1678 deaths
Italian art collectors
Italian art patrons
Italian nobility
Antonio
People from Bagnara Calabra